Mass Hysteria is a French heavy metal band formed in 1993 that released nine studio albums and four live albums between 1997 and 2018. Their breakthrough came in 1999 with their second album Contraddiction.

The band 
Mass Hysteria is known for their eclecticism, combining industrial metal, alternative metal, rock and rap (2001–2005).

Language 
The band sings primarily in French which has made them an exception throughout the metal sphere.

History 
Created in 1993, the band recorded their first album, Le Bien-être et la Paix (Well-being and Peace), four years later. After this album, Mass Hysteria's breakthrough album came in 1999 with the release of Contraddiction which sold  over 50,000 copies. The album itself is still widely regarded as the band's iconic 'Black album'. It was produced and mixed by Colin Richardson.

In 2001 the band returned after intensive touring with a different approach with the release of 'De Cercle en Cercle'. This album received mixed feelings with the arrival of new guitarist Olivier Coursier. The album's new pop/rap experiment approach left the band isolated from the metal scene. Michel Houellebecq, met in Québec, was supposed to write one of the songs but the agreement was never finalized.
In 2005 the band released 'Mass Hysteria' confirming the band's new, softer pop/metal approach. Finally, in 2007 with the departure of Olivier and arrival of Nicolas Savoury the band returned with 'Une somme de détails' (an addition of details). The album pushed Mass Hysteria back to its root of origin that made it a success. This album was heavier than ever, and began to close-in on the level of success of  'Contraddiction'. Two years later, in late 2009, the band released 'Failles' (cracks). The album's cover undeniably confirmed the band's renewed connection with 'contraddiction' (also in red and black). The album received critical acclaim.

In the mass media, Mass Hysteria was known for some controversies and incidents surrounding them. But some critics have also noticed the quality of their music and their growing success.

In 1998 the band played in Quebec, Montreal at the Spectrum. They recorded a live album there on May 16. The concert hall was torn down in 2008.
In 2001 the band played at the Pollywog in Montreal, Québec, Canada on August 11, 2001.
In 2008 the band played at the Sziget Festival in Óbudai-Sziget, Budapest, Hungary on August 16, 2008.
In 2008 the band played at the Club Soda in Montreal, Québec, Canada on August 19, 2008.
In 2009 Metallica called on Mass Hysteria to open for their sold-out show at the 'Arènes de Nîmes'. 
In 2010 the band returned to Quebec to attend a special tour along with French metal band AqME.
In 2010 the band played in Lörrach, Germany on January 29. 
In 2011 the band released its anticipated first DVD live recorded and filmed in Toulouse (southern France). 
On July 9, 2011 the band participated at Sonisphere France along with the big four.
In 2011 the band played 3 dates in New Caledonia (Pacific). On November 15 & 22 they appeared at Festival Rock in Dore (Village de Bohème). On November 20 the band played at 'Nouméa, Baie des Citrons' - Salle Le Bohème.

Touring 
In the last 25 years the band has played principally in France, Belgium and Switzerland. The 1998 Contradiction Tour resulted in over 300 concerts throughout France. In 2013, Mass Hysteria
began La Tournée des ombres as part of the band's 20th anniversary and to promote their most recent album. The tour for their album " Matière Noire " was 120 shows going all over France, Switzerland, Belgium, Quebec and Russia.

Background 
The band's current line-up are from Brest and Rouen & Paris. 
Mouss is from the city of Brest (Brittany). 
Raphael and Yann are from Paris and Jamie is from Bray, Co. Wicklow (Ireland).

Members

Current members 
Mouss Kelai — Vocals (since 1993)
Raphael Mercier — Drums (since 1993)
Yann Heurtaux — Guitar (since 1995)
Frédéric "Fred" Duquesne — Guitar (since 2014)
Jamie Ryan — Bass (since 2017)

Former members 
Vincent "Vinz" Mercier — Bass (2012–2016)
Nicolas "Nico" Sarrouy — Guitar (2007–2014)
Olivier Coursier — Guitar & Sampling (2000–2007)
Pascal Jeannet aka Overload System — Sampling (1995–2000)
Stéphane Jaquet — Bass (1993–2011; died 2021)
Atom — Bass (2016–2017)
Erwan Disez — Guitar (1993–1999)

Timeline

Discography

Albums
 1997 : 'Le Bien-être et la Paix'
 "L'Homme qui en savait trop rien" - 4:16
 "Knowledge is power" - 2:56
 "Mass protect" - 3:53
 "Shine" - 3:22
 "L'Effet papillon" - 3:27
 "Donnez-vous la peine" - 3:42
 "Hard corps" - 1:54
 "Gone" - 5:22
 "Respect to the dance-floor" - 3:00
 "Unique" - 3:22
 "MH2" - 3:16
 "Knowdege is power (New Year's Remix)" - 4:06

 1999 : 'Contraddiction'

 2001 : 'De cercle en cercle'
 "Remède" - 5:21
 "La Puissance Bienvenue" - 4:00
 "La Aventura Humana" - 3:44
 "Ya Vyemma" - 5:48
 "Millenium Appauvri" - 4:40
 "Fragment" (instrumental) - 1:13
 "Immixtion" (featuring La Brigade) - 3:55
 "La Canopée" - 3:46
 "Temps Mort" (instrumental) - 3:41
 "L'Harmonie Invisible" - 3:41
 "Coup2Mass" - 4:50
 "Montherlant" - 3:42
 "L'Importance Du Sort" - 5:26

 2005 : 'Mass Hysteria'
 "Poison d'asile" - 3:17
 "Instant Film" - 3:15
 "L'Emo clef" - 3:16
 "Fausse route" - 4:00
 "On coule !" - 3:03
 "Intérieur à revoir" - 3:30
 "Un homme à la mer" - 3:45
 "Désaxé" - 4:10
 "La Permanence" - 4:06
 "Pures heures" - 3:21
 "Laissez pensez" - 3:14
 "La Démesure" - 4:07
 "Sexylex" - 2:52

 2007 : 'Une somme de détails'
 "Des nouvelles du ciel" - 3:25
 "Babylone" - 3:25
 "Une somme de détails" - 2:51
 "Killing the hype (ruff style!)" - 3:14
 "Échec" - 3:54
 "L'Espoir fou" - 3:13
 "Nous sommes bien" - 3:21
 "Je ressens" - 3:52
 "Regarde le monde" - 3:16
 "Se lover dans les flammes" - 3:32
 "Mon horizon" - 2:12
 "Une joie kamikaze" - 2:39
 "Briller pour toi" (Featuring Manu Monet) - 3:47

 2009 : 'Failles'
 "World On Fire" - 04:08
 "Plus qu'aucune mer" - 04:07
 "Failles" - 03:34
 "L'archipel des pensées" - 03:29
 "Clean" - 03:13
 "Dysphoria" - 02:56
 "Le magnétisme des sentiments" - 04:10
 "Aller plus loin" - 02:56
 "Respirer" - 04:04
 "Get High" - 03:46
 "Rien n'être plus" - 03:18
 "Comme on danse" - 03:10

 2012: 'L'Armée Des Ombres'
 "Positif à bloc" - 2:58
 "L'homme s'entête" - 3:36
 "Commedia dell'inferno" - 3:37
 "Même si j'explose" - 5:05
 "L'esprit du temps" - 3:25
 "Tout doit disparaître" 4:25
 "Sérum barbare" - 4:04
 "Raison close" - 4:57
 "Pulsion" - 2:17
 "Vertiges des mondes" - 2:50 
CD Bonus Tracks
 "La valse des pantins" - 3:10 "Soyez vous-même" - 4:18

 2015: Matière Noire
 "Chiens de la Casse" - 4:00
 "Vae Soli !" - 5:09
 "Vector Equilibrium" - 4:34
 "Notre Complot" - 4:43
 "L'Espérance et le Refus" - 4:53
 "Tout est Poison " - 4:53
 "L'Enfer des Dieux" - 4:09
 "À Bout de Souffle" - 3:24
 "Matière Noire" - 4:42
 "Plus que du Metal" - 3:39
 "Mère d'Iroise" - 5:09

 2018: 'Maniac'
 "Reprendre mes esprits" - 2:47
 "Ma niaque" - 2:59
 "Partager nos ombres" - 3:55
 "L'antre ciel ether" - 3:47
 "Chaman acide" - 3:34
 "Se brûler sûrement" - 3:41
 "Nerf de bœuf" - 4:31
 "Aromes complexes" - 3:55
 "Derrière la foudre" - 5:12
 "We came to hold up your mind" - 4:14

Live
 1998 : Live à Montréal (live performance recorded in Montréal, Canada)
 2011 : Mass Hysteria : Live (live performance recorded in Toulouse, France)
 2013 : Mass Hysteria à l'Olympia (live performance recorded in Paris, France)
 2016 : Mass Hysteria Le Trianon (live performance recorded in Paris, France)

References

Alternative metal musical groups
French industrial metal musical groups
French nu metal musical groups
Musical groups from Paris